DOVO may refer to:

 DOVO Solingen or DOVO Steelware, German manufacturer of grooming tools
 VV DOVO, Dutch football club

Dovo may refer to:
 Eloi Alphonse Maxime Dovo,  Malagasy diplomat and politician.